Erika Jucá Kokay (born 15 August 1957) is a Brazilian politician. Although born in Ceará, she has spent her political career representing the Federal District, having served as state representative since 2011.

Personal life
Kokay was born to Lojos Ferenz Kokay and Maria do Perpétuo Socorro Jucá. Prior to becoming a politician Kokay worked as a banker. Kokay has also worked as a syndicalist since 1992, and is a member and past president of the trade union Central Única dos Trabalhadores.

Political career
Kokay voted against the impeachment motion of then-president Dilma Rousseff. Kokay voted against the 2017 Brazilian labor reform, and she would vote in favor of a corruption investigation into Rousseff's successor Michel Temer.

Kokay is fervently against the nonpartisan school bill, stating that it would limit free speech in the educational system and make students "enemies of the nation". Kokay supported the National Truth Commission which investigates crimes committed by the military dictatorship in Brazil from 1946–1988. She is a supporter of LGBT rights, which was a central theme of her 2018 re-election campaign.

She was investigated in April 2019 for allegedly misusing funds after requesting that one of her peers be investigated, Kokay claimed that she was being investigated in retaliation and that she was "completely calm" regarding the potencial outcome.

References

1957 births
Living people
People from Fortaleza
Brazilian bankers
Syndicalists
Brazilian trade unionists
Workers' Party (Brazil) politicians
Members of the Chamber of Deputies (Brazil) from the Federal District
Brazilian LGBT rights activists
21st-century Brazilian women politicians